Alexey Shmider (born 19 March 1990, Alma-Ata) is a Kazakhstani water polo player. At the 2012 Summer Olympics, he competed for the Kazakhstan men's national water polo team in the men's event.

References

Kazakhstani male water polo players
1990 births
Living people
Olympic water polo players of Kazakhstan
Water polo players at the 2012 Summer Olympics
Kazakhstani people of Russian descent
Asian Games medalists in water polo
Water polo players at the 2014 Asian Games
Water polo players at the 2018 Asian Games
Asian Games gold medalists for Kazakhstan
Medalists at the 2014 Asian Games
Medalists at the 2018 Asian Games
Sportspeople from Almaty
Water polo players at the 2020 Summer Olympics
21st-century Kazakhstani people